Marty Hendin (March 16, 1948 – January 12, 2008) was a baseball executive who worked in various marketing, public relations, and community relations posts for the St. Louis Cardinals of Major League Baseball. Inducted into the University of Missouri-St. Louis Sports Hall of Fame in 2003, Hendin began his career with the Cardinals in 1973.

Early years
Hendin was born to his parents Pearl and Sholom on March 16, 1948. After graduating from University City High School in 1966, Hendin moved on to attend the University of Missouri-St. Louis. Hendin was the first sportswriter on staff of the UMSL student newspaper The Current, later rising to become the sports editor. He also made his mark at UMSL by founding the University's first spirit club, known as "The Steamers".

Known for an innovative focus on capturing the attention of younger baseball fans, Hendin is credited with helping spur the popularity of team mascot Fredbird. Commenting on the creation of Fredbird, Hendin said,

Hendin also gained notarity for a unique collection of Cardinal and baseball memorabilia in his office at Busch Memorial Stadium that was dubbed "Trinket City." A portion of Hendin's extensive 33 year memorabilia collection is currently on display in the UMSL Student Center. The other portion is on display inside of the new Busch Stadium and can be seen during a stadium tour.

Death
He died from cancer, aged 59, in 2008.

Honors
Hendin was inducted into the University of Missouri-St. Louis Sports Hall of Fame in 2003 under the category of distinguished service for his, "work and dedication to the UMSL Athletic Department." Hendin was inducted into the St. Louis Jewish Sports Hall of Fame in 2010.

References 

1948 births
2008 deaths
20th-century American Jews
Major League Baseball executives
Businesspeople from St. Louis
St. Louis Cardinals executives
University of Missouri–St. Louis alumni
Deaths from cancer in Missouri
20th-century American businesspeople
21st-century American Jews